Nicotiana tabacum, or cultivated tobacco, is an annually grown herbaceous plant of the Nicotiana genus. The plant is tropical in origin, is commonly grown throughout the world, and is often found in cultivation. It grows to heights between 1 and 2 meters (3' to 6'). Research is ongoing into its ancestry among wild Nicotiana species, but it is believed to be a hybrid of Nicotiana sylvestris, Nicotiana tomentosiformis, and possibly Nicotiana otophora. It is the most commonly grown of all plants in the genus Nicotiana, the plants' leaves commercially grown to be processed into tobacco.

Description
The stems are thick and not very branched.

The scented inflorescences are multi-branched panicles. The crown is plate-shaped, the coronet is white, pink or red, the corolla tube greenish-cream, pink or red. The coronet is lobed or pentagonal. The stamens are designed unevenly and start below the center of the corolla tube. The anthers of the four longer stamens are close to the opening of the corolla tube or are slightly above it. The fifth stamen is significantly shorter than both longer pairs.

It can stand out over the chalice or be enclosed by it.

Almost every part of the plant except the seed contains nicotine, but the concentration is related to different factors such as species, type of land, culture and weather conditions. The concentration of nicotine increases with the age of the plant. Tobacco leaves contain 2 to 8% nicotine combined as malate or citrate. The distribution of the nicotine in the mature plant is widely variable: 64% of the total nicotine exists in the leaves, 18% in the stem, 13% in the root, and 5% in the flowers.

Phytochemistry 
Natural tobacco polysaccharides, including cellulose, have been shown to be the primary precursors of acetaldehyde in tobacco smoke. The main polyphenols contained in the tobacco leaf are rutin and chlorogenic acid. Amino acids contained include glutamic acids, asparagine, glutamine, and γ-Aminobutyric acid  

Pyridine alkaloids are present in tobacco as free bases and salts. Nicotine accounts for 90-95% of the plant's pyridines with Nornicotine and anatabine accounting for roughly 2.5% each. Pyridyl functional groups present in minute amounts include anabasine, myosmine, cotinine and 2, 3′-bipyridyl. Indole alkaloids are also present in leaves and stems which includes harmala alkaloids as well. Yohimbine, harmine, haramaline and ajmalicine occurs in descending order, yohimbine being highest.

The tobacco plant readily absorbs heavy metals from the surrounding soil and accumulates them in its leaves. These are readily absorbed into the user's body following smoke inhalation.

Tobacco also contains the following phytochemicals: glucosides (tabacinine, tabacine), 2,3,6-trimethyl-1,4-naphthoquinone, 2-methylquinone, 2-napthylamine, propionic acid, anthalin, anethole, acrolein, cembrene, choline, nicotelline, nicotianine, and pyrene.

Megastigmatrienone 
Tobacco aroma is due to presence of different volatile compounds; megastigmatrienone being the key flavor compound in tobacco. Megastigmatrienone is used as flavour in tobacco products as well.

Megastigmatrienone, a cyclohexenone, and a carotenoid-derived aromatic compound, produces spice notes associated with wine.

Megastigmatrienone is a metabolite of Brewer's yeast.

Megastigmatrienone, as Tabanone, is manufactured by Symrise as a perfume ingredient.

Habitat and ecology
N. tabacum is a native of tropical and subtropical America, also appearing as a weed.

N. tabacum is sensitive to temperature, air, ground humidity and the type of land.

Parasites 
The potato tuber moth (Phthorimaea operculella) is an oligophagous insect that prefers to feed on plants of the family Solanaceae such as tobacco plants. Female P. operculella use the leaves to lay their eggs and the hatched larvae will eat away at the mesophyll of the leaf.

Uses 
The plant is native to the Caribbean, where the Taíno people were the first recorded peoples to use it and cultivate it.
In 1560, Jean Nicot de Villemain, then French ambassador to Portugal, brought tobacco seeds and leaves as a "wonder drug" to the French court. In 1586 the botanist Jaques Dalechamps gave the plant the name of Herba nicotiana, which was also adopted by Linné. It was considered a decorative plant at first, then a panacea, before it became a common snuff and tobacco plant.

Tobacco arrived in Africa at the beginning of the 17th century. The leaf extract was a popular pest control method up to the beginning of the 20th century. In 1851, the Belgian chemist Jean Stas documented the use of tobacco extract as a murder poison. The Belgian count Hippolyte Visart de Bocarmé had poisoned his brother-in-law with tobacco leaf extract in order to acquire some urgently needed money. This was the first exact proof of alkaloids in forensic medicine.

It is now commercially cultivated worldwide. All parts of the plant contain nicotine, which can be extracted and used as an insecticide. The dried leaves can also be used; they remain effective for 6 months after drying. The juice of the leaves can be rubbed on the body as an insect repellent. The leaves can be dried and chewed as an intoxicant. The dried leaves are also used as snuff or are smoked. This is the main species that is used to make cigarettes, cigars, and other products for smokers. A drying oil is obtained from the seed.

Other varieties are cultivated as ornamental plants.

Curing and aging 
After tobacco is harvested, it is cured (dried), and then aged to improve its flavor. There are four common methods of curing tobacco: air curing, fire curing, flue curing, and sun curing. The curing method used depends on the type of tobacco and its intended use.
Air-cured tobacco is sheltered from wind and sun in a well-ventilated barn, where it air dries for six to eight weeks. Air-cured tobacco is low in sugar, which gives the tobacco smoke a light, sweet flavour, and high in nicotine. Cigar and burley tobaccos are air cured.

In fire curing, smoke from a low-burning fire on the barn floor permeates the leaves. This gives the leaves a distinctive smoky aroma and flavor. Fire curing takes three to ten weeks and produces a tobacco low in sugar and high in nicotine. Pipe tobacco, chewing tobacco, and snuff are fire cured.

Flue-cured tobacco is kept in an enclosed barn heated by flues (pipes) of hot air, but the tobacco is not directly exposed to smoke. This method produces cigarette tobacco that is high in sugar and has medium to high levels of nicotine. It is the fastest method of curing, requiring about a week. Virginia tobacco that has been flue cured is also called bright tobacco, because flue curing turns its leaves gold, orange, or yellow.

Sun-cured tobacco dries uncovered in the sun. This method is used in Greece, Turkey, and other Mediterranean countries to produce oriental tobacco. Sun-cured tobacco is low in sugar and nicotine and is used in cigarettes.

Once the tobacco is cured, workers tie it into small bundles of about 20 leaves, called hands, or use a machine to make large blocks, called bales. The hands or bales are aged for one to three years to improve flavor and reduce bitterness.

Ethnomedicinal uses 

The regions that have histories of use of the plant include:
Brazil: The leaf juice is taken orally to induce vomiting and narcosis.
Colombia: Fresh leaf is used as poultice over boils and infected wounds; the leaves are crushed with oil from palms and used as hair treatment to prevent baldness.
Cuba: Extract of the leaf is taken orally to treat dysmenorrhea.
East Africa: Dried leaves of Nicotiana tabacum and Securinega virosa are mixed into a paste and used externally to destroy worms in sores.
Ecuador: Leaf juice is used for indisposition, chills and snake bites and to treat pulmonary ailments.
Fiji: Fresh root is taken orally for asthma and indigestion; fresh root is applied ophthalmically as drops for bloodshot eyes and other problems; seed is taken orally for rheumatism and to treat hoarseness.
Guatemala: Leaves are applied externally by adults for myiasis, headache and wounds; hot water extract of the dried leaf is applied externally for ring worms, fungal diseases of the skin, wounds, ulcers, bruises, sores, mouth lesions, stomatitis and mucosa; leaf is orally taken for kidney diseases.
Haiti: Decoction of dried leaf is taken orally for bronchitis and pneumonia.
Hong Kong: Fresh leaves are mashed and combined with vegetable oil to create a potion that is applied to injuries for it to heal faster. This practice is also apparent in other places in China.
Iran: Infusion of the dried leaf is applied externally as an insect repellent; ointments made from crushed leaves are used for baldness, dermatitis and infectious ulceration and as a pediculicide.
Mexico (south-eastern): Among the ancient Maya, Nicotiana was considered a sacred plant, closely associated with deities of earth and sky, and used for both visionary and therapeutic ends. The contemporary Tzeltal and Tzotzil Maya of Highland Chiapas (Mexico) are bearers of this ethnobotanical inheritance, preserving a rich and varied tradition of Nicotiana use and folklore. The entire tobacco plant is viewed as a primordial medicine and a powerful botanical "helper" or "protector". Depending on the condition to be treated, whole Nicotiana leaves are used alone or in combination with other herbs in the preparation of various medicinal plasters and teas. In its most common form, fresh or ‘‘green’’ leaves are ground with slaked lime to produce an intoxicating oral snuff that serves as both a protective and therapeutic agent.
United States: Extract of N. tabacum is taken orally to treat tiredness, ward off diseases, and quiet fear.
Tanzania: Leaves of Nicotiana tabacum are placed in the vagina to stimulate labour.
Zimbabwe: Leaves or root of the plant are infused and taken by mouth for asthma and other respiratory problems. Leaves and roots are also rubbed against warts and wounds as ointment.

Gallery

See also 

 Nicotiana rustica

References

External links 

tabacum
Tobacco
Flora of North America
Flora of Central America
Flora of the Dominican Republic
Flora of South America
Crops originating from North America
Crops originating from South America
Plants used in traditional Native American medicine
Tobacco in Mexico
Tobacco in the United States
Neotropical realm flora
Plants described in 1753
Taxa named by Carl Linnaeus
Flora without expected TNC conservation status